The K-1000 battleship was rumoured to be a type of advanced battleship produced by the Soviet Union at the beginning of the Cold War. Soviet intelligence agencies actively encouraged the circulation of rumours about the type, which were reprinted by several Western journals including Jane's Fighting Ships.

History 
Accounts of the new Soviet battleships appeared in journals in France, Germany and the US in the late 1940s and early 1950s. The rumours were unclear about the specifications of the ships. The main point of agreement between different descriptions was that the type carried guided missiles, mounted in distinctive domed turrets, in addition to a conventional heavy gun armament. The ships were often said to have been laid down in Siberian shipyards.

The main armament was normally said to be twelve  guns, though sometimes nine  guns were alleged.

The names assigned to the class were said to be Strana Sovetov, Sovetskaya Byelorussia, Krasnaya Bessarabiya, Krasnaya Sibir, Sovietskaya Konstitutsia, Lenin and Sovetsky Soyuz. Many of the names were re-used from units of the authentic, but never completed,  which were under construction when World War II broke out.

The Soviet Union actively perpetrated the hoax class of warships. A Soviet 'fleet recognition manual' planted in the West seemed to confirm the existence and general features of the K-1000 Heavy Fleet Unit Sovetskaya Byelorussia, and that she was in commission from 10 November 1953. The accompanying drawings, showing two missile domes, six heavy guns and a cluster of lighter armament, gave a further veneer of accuracy to the document. In fact the drawings were a direct copy of the 1949–50 edition of Jane's Fighting Ships.

In reality, the USSR was (like other naval powers) retiring or scrapping its existing battleships, which had been rendered obsolete by the aircraft carrier. The United States Navy considered creating a 'missile battleship' out of the unfinished , which would have had some similarities to the fictional K-1000 class; however, this plan never went ahead.

References

Battleships of the Soviet Navy
Disinformation operations
Fictional ships of the Soviet Navy
Information operations and warfare